The McKee Street Bridge carries McKee Street across Buffalo Bayou in Houston, Texas. Built in 1932, the three-span reinforced concrete girder bridge connects the Second and Fifth Ward areas, northeast of downtown Houston. The bridge was listed on the National Register of Historic Places on September 3, 2002.

Description
The  continuous girder bridge is divided into two  spans and a center  span. The center span crosses the entire central channel of Buffalo Bayou. The bridge provides  of vertical clearance. The road surface atop the concrete deck is  brick on a  sand cushion. The concrete girders are curved in a way that is aesthetically pleasing and reveals the distribution of the bridge's load on the girders. The bridge was painted aquamarine, purple, and lavender by a local artist in 1985.

History
Buffalo Bayou was an import trade route between Houston and Galveston Bay as early as 1836. Steamboat service was established in 1837. The area around the future McKee Street had become a major industrial and commercial center by the start of the twentieth century. The new automobile as well as continued growth in train and bayou transportation required more, and better, bridges. The first bridge built at McKee street was a steel truss swing bridge, using a motor to move the bridge out of the way of water traffic.

The 1932 bridge was built to replace the 1908 bridge that had been demolished in 1928. A requirement by the War Department for both a minimum vertical and horizontal clearance, coupled with McKee Street meeting the bayou at a 77-degree angle required a new bridge that was unique for its time. The concrete girders, usually designed as any other type of wood or steel beam, were instead shaped to match the calculated bending moment curve, resulting in reduced cost and a longer span. Indeed, the central span was the longest of any concrete girder bridge at the time, and the undulating wave-like shape had also never been used before. The bridge was built between 1931 and 1932 for a contracted price, including removal of the previous bridge, of $122,000.

See also
List of bridges documented by the Historic American Engineering Record in Texas
National Register of Historic Places listings in Harris County, Texas

References

External links

1932 establishments in Texas
Bridges completed in 1932
Concrete bridges in the United States
Girder bridges in the United States
Historic American Engineering Record in Texas
National Register of Historic Places in Houston
Road bridges on the National Register of Historic Places in Texas
Transportation buildings and structures in Houston